Jonathan Thomas Morgan (born September 1982) is a former New Hampshire politician. A Democrat, Morgan represented the 23rd district in the New Hampshire Senate for one term; he was defeated in the 2020 election by his predecessor, Republican Bill Gannon. Morgan served as vice chair of Senate Commerce, and on the Election Law & Municipal Affairs and Education & Workforce Development committees. The 23rd district covers nine towns in central Rockingham County. Morgan is currently a member of the Brentwood Board of selectmen.

Prior to his election to the Senate, Morgan was a contractor for the Department of Defense, and continues to work at a cybersecurity firm based in Silicon Valley.

References

External links

21st-century American politicians
Living people
Democratic Party New Hampshire state senators
University of Notre Dame alumni
People from Brentwood, New Hampshire
1982 births